is a Japanese manga series written and illustrated by Taku Tsumugi. It was adapted into a live action film that was released on 16 August 2014.

Characters
Kazuki Miyaichi  lives with her mother. Kazuki does not like her mother's boyfriend and she feels that she is not loved by her mother. This leads Kazuki to get into trouble.
Kazuki's mother 
Hiroshi Haruyama  is a troubled kid who does part-time jobs for a living instead of going to school. He is a member of the motorcycle gang “Nights”.
Tōru Tamami

Live-action film 

A live-action film based on the manga was released on August 16, 2014.Takahiro Miki directed the film. The film stars  Rena Nōnen as Kazuki Miyaichi  and Hiroomi Tosaka as Hiroshi Haruyama.

References

External links

1986 manga
Manga adapted into films
Shueisha franchises
Shueisha manga
Shōjo manga
Yankī anime and manga
Japanese romantic drama films